Noctuini is a tribe of owlet moths in the family Noctuidae. There are at least 520 described species in Noctuini.

Noctuini genera

 Abagrotis Smith, 1890
 Actebia Stephens, 1829
 Adelphagrotis Smith, 1890
 Agnorisma Lafontaine, 1998
 Agrotis Ochsenheimer, 1816
 Anaplectoides McDunnough, 1929
 Anicla Grote, 1874
 Aplectoides Butler, 1878
 Cerastis Ochsenheimer, 1816
 Chersotis Boisduval, 1840
 Choephora Grote & Robinson, 1868
 Coenophila Stephens, 1850
 Copablepharon Harvey, 1878
 Cryptocala Benjamin, 1921
 Diarsia Hübner, 1821
 Dichagyris Lederer, 1857
 Eucoptocnemis Grote, 1874
 Eueretagrotis Smith, 1890
 Eurois Hübner, 1821
 Euxoa Hübner, 1821
 Feltia Walker, 1856
 Graphiphora Ochsenheimer, 1816
 Hemieuxoa McDunnough, 1929
 Hemipachnobia McDunnough, 1929
 Isochlora Staudinger, 1882
 Lycophotia Hübner, 1821
 Noctua Linnaeus, 1758 (yellow underwings)
 Ochropleura Hübner, 1821
 Parabagrotis Lafontaine, 1998
 Parabarrovia Gibson, 1920
 Paradiarsia McDunnough, 1929
 Peridroma Hübner, 1821
 Prognorisma Lafontaine, 1998
 Pronoctua Smith, 1894
 Protogygia McDunnough, 1929
 Protolampra McDunnough, 1929
 Pseudohermonassa Varga in Varga, Ronkay & Yela, 1990
 Rhyacia Hübner, 1821
 Richia Grote, 1887
 Setagrotis Smith, 1890
 Spaelotis Boisduval, 1840
 Striacosta Lafontaine, 2004
 Tesagrotis Lafontaine, 1998
 Xestia Hübner, 1818

References

 Lafontaine, J. Donald & Schmidt, B. Christian (2010). "Annotated check list of the Noctuoidea (Insecta, Lepidoptera) of North America north of Mexico". ZooKeys, vol. 40, 1-239.
 Lafontaine, J. Donald / Dominick, R. B. et al., eds. (1998). "Noctuoidea Noctuidae (part) Noctuinae (part - Noctuini)". The Moths of America North of Mexico, fasc. 27.3, 348.

Further reading

External links

 Butterflies and Moths of North America

Noctuinae